Lamboziki is the second studio album recorded by Kosovo-Albanian rapper Mozzik. It was released for digital download and streaming on 13 February 2022 by 2 Euro Gang and Urban as a follow-up to Mozzart (2020). Lasting for 43 minutes and 35 seconds across 14 songs, the rapper extensively collaborated with Kosovo-Albanian producers Pellumb and Rzon on the record. It was classified as a hip hop, pop and R&B album, comprising songs performed mainly in Albanian with limited lines in English, French, and German. Upon release, Lamboziki saw a moderate commercial success, reaching number 42 in Switzerland. Three singles released throughout October 2021 to January 2022 preceded the record, including "" featuring Noizy, "" and "" with Elvana Gjata. The former three were all accompanied by music videos and entered the single charts in Albania and Switzerland.

Background and composition 

Preceded by a teaser in October 2021, Mozzik announced Lamboziki as his second studio album on his social media accounts and revealed the record's title and cover art. The latter depicts a golden portrait of the rapper positioned in a black coat of arms, resembling the logo of Italian manufacturer Lamborghini, with lettering displayed in gold above the coat. The tracklist and release date as 13 February 2022 were unveiled through the rapper's social media on another occasion in early February. The record was ultimately issued in various countries on the announced date by 2 Euro Gang and Urban, a subsidiary of Universal. Lamboziki contains 14 songs and lasts for 43 minutes and 35 seconds. For the record, Mozzik collaborated with Kosovo-Albanian producers Pellumb and Rzon, while also being involved in the writing process of all the songs. Critical commentary noted the record to incorporate hip hop, pop and R&B music, with funk, rock, urban elements. The record's songs are predominantly performed in Albanian, with several songs encompassing German, English and French lyrics, as well.

Promotion 

Lamboziki was supported by three singles, including its accompanying music videos, which premiered from October 2021 to January 2022. "" was released as the record's first single on 21 October and featured the Albanian rapper Noizy. Described as a hip hop, R&B and urban song, it lyrically focuses on pleasure and passion, and is concentrated on a desire to attract the attention of an independent woman. Commercially, the recording reached number 14 on Switzerland's Top 100 chart in late October. The record's second single, "", followed on 24 November, and entered the top five on Albania's Top 100 chart in early December. Musically a pop song with funk and rock components, its video game-inspired music video was well received by reviewers, who lauded Mozzik's appearance, and noted the retro and science-fiction visuals. This was followed on 27 January 2022 by the premiere of the record's third single "", an urban and R&B recording delving into the concepts of empowerment and self-love. Collaborating with Albanian singer and songwriter Elvana Gjata, it reached number three in Albania and peaked at number 33 in Switzerland. To further promote the record's premiere, a single music video for "Patrolla" and "Kriminela" was released during the record's release.

Upon release, Lamboziki experienced a moderate commercial success in Switzerland, debuting and peaking at number 42 on the Swiss albums charts. Four other songs from the record, including "", "", "" and "Ye Ye", debuted within the top 100 in Albania for the week ending 19 February 2022.

Track listing 

Credits and tracklist adapted from Spotify.

Credits and personnel

Credits adapted from Spotify and Tidal.

Mozziksongwriting, vocals
Darko Dimitrovmastering, mixing
Elvana Gjatafeatured vocals
Getinjofeatured vocals
Noizyfeatured vocals, songwriting
Pellumbproducing, songwriting
Rzonproducing, songwriting
Rvchetproducing, songwriting

Charts

Release history

References 

2022 albums
Albanian-language albums
Contemporary R&B albums
Pop-rap albums